Hinkle's Ferry is an unincorporated community in Brazoria County, Texas, United States. According to the Handbook of Texas, the community had a population of 35 in 2000. It is located within the Greater Houston metropolitan area.

History
A post office was established at Hinkle's Ferry in 1887 and remained in operation until 1914, with J.V. Hinkle as postmaster. Hinkle also owned a general store in the community in 1884, with locals shipping cotton, sugar, and molasses. Its population went up to 35 in 1896 and stayed at that number through the 20th century and the early 2000s. Also that same year, the community had a gristmill, gin, several general stores, and a Methodist church. It had two businesses and several scattered houses in 1936. An old store building remained in the community as of 2015 and serves as a private residence. Descendants of J.V. Hinkle still own property on both sides of the San Bernard River.

Geography
It was established around an old ferry crossing just north of where Farm to Market Road 310 used to cross the river.

Education
In 1896, Hinkle's Ferry had a school with one teacher and 11 students. Today, the community is served by the Angleton Independent School District. Children in the area attend Rancho Isabella Elementary School, Angleton Junior High School, and Angleton High School in Angleton.

References

Unincorporated communities in Brazoria County, Texas
Unincorporated communities in Texas